Hubert Gorbach (born 27 July 1956) is an Austrian politician and a member of the Alliance for the Future of Austria (BZÖ). Until April 2005, he was a leading member in the Freedom Party. Born in Vorarlberg, he was vice-governor of Vorarlberg until 2003.

In 2003, he succeeded Herbert Haupt as Vice-Chancellor of Austria. From February 2003 until June 2004, Gorbach was Federal Minister for Transport, Innovation and Technology in Austria in a coalition government headed by the People's Party.

Before starting his political career, he was a manager in the textile industry (Getzner).

He is married and is interested in horses.

He has praised Alexander Lukashenko's Belarus, stating its elections are "up to West European standards".

In October 2011, Hubert Gorbach lost his driving licence because of driving under the influence.

Notes

References
 GORBACH, Hubert International Who's Who. accessed 8 September 2006.
 GORBACH, Hubert Homepage.
  Profil Weekly Newspaper. Accessed 10-22-2011.

1956 births
Living people
People from Feldkirch District
Vice-Chancellors of Austria
21st-century Austrian politicians